Alimagnet Lake is a lake in Dakota County, in the U.S. state of Minnesota. The lake stands in Burnsville, south of Minneapolis.

Alimagnet Park 
The surrounding forestland is a public park.

See also 

 List of lakes in Minnesota

References 

Lakes of Minnesota
Lakes of Itasca County, Minnesota